</noinclude>
Many students attending colleges, universities, and other higher education institutions consume alcoholic beverages. The laws and social culture around this practice vary by country and institution type, and within an institution, some students may drink heavily whereas others may not drink at all. In the United States, drinking tends to be particularly associated with fraternities.

Alcohol abuse among college students refers to unhealthy alcohol drinking behaviors by college and university students. While the legal drinking age varies by country, the high amount of underage students that consume alcohol has presented many problems and consequences for universities. The causes of alcohol abuse tend to be peer pressure, fraternity or sorority involvement, and stress. College students who abuse alcohol can suffer from health concerns, poor academic performance or legal consequences. Prevention and treatment include campus counseling, stronger enforcement of underage drinking or changing the campus culture.

Definitions

Binge drinking 

Binge drinking occurs when students drink large amounts of alcohol in a relatively short space of time in order to feel the full effects of alcohol consumption. The National Institute on Alcohol Abuse and Alcoholism (NIAAA) defines binge drinking as a pattern of drinking that brings a person's blood alcohol concentration (BAC) to 0.08 percent or above. BAC is the measure of alcohol in one's bloodstream; a BAC of 0.08, therefore, means that 0.08% of the bloodstream consists of alcohol. This is usually seen when men consume five or more drinks, and when women consume four or more drinks in a two-hour time period. Factors that can affect a person's BAC include body weight, biological sex, medications, the number of drinks consumed, and the time during which they have been consumed. 

Most people younger than age 21 who drink alcohol report binge drinking. The rates of college students binge drinking in the United States have fluctuated for the past years. In college, over 50% of students take part in binge drinking, while 80% of college students report having consumed alcohol during college. Over half of universities' student bodies consist of those under the legal drinking age of 21. Underage drinking is when people below the legal drinking age consume alcohol. This fluctuates for every country: 21 in the United States, 18 in the United Kingdom.

Young adults who participate in binge drinking experience higher rates of physical and sexual assault, and unwanted, unplanned, and unprotected sexual activity. There are also links between heavy alcohol consumption and depression.

The motivations among young students have changed as well. In recent years, more students are drinking with the intended purpose of getting drunk.

Background
The National Institute on Alcohol Abuse and Alcoholism reported in 2012, that more than 80% of college students drink alcohol, with estimated 40% report binge drinking in the past two weeks, and about 25% report having academic consequences because of their drinking. 56% of students reported binge drinking once a week. In comparison, the comparable figure of alcoholism for American Indian and Alaskan Native youth is approximately 80 percent.

Individual and environmental factors for experiencing alcohol-related consequences have been identified such as drinking during high-risk periods, such as spring break, or belonging to specific student subgroups (e.g., Greek organizations). Drinking throughout high school also played a role, suggesting that binge drinking starts earlier than college for some.

Causes

Peer pressure 
In 2001, there were 1,717 unintentional deaths from the consumption of alcohol or other substances, which raised concerns about the excessive use of alcohol. There are many causes of excessive drinking on college campuses. Many students report they felt peer pressured to consume large amounts of alcohol. Peer pressure may occur in multiple forms. One of the more indirect forms of peer pressure is social modelling. In this method, the more “popular” people from a group could be consuming alcohol, and pressure others to drink in excess to fit in and be part of the larger group.

Greek life
A survey taken of one national chapter proved that 97% of their members were drinkers, and 64% of them took part in binge drinking. This is higher than the usual college average of 80% drinkers and 50% binge drinkers. Currently there are over 12,000 fraternity or sorority chapters in the United States with over 750,000 members which raises concerns for student college life at universities. A study showed that members who were part of a fraternity reported two or more symptoms of alcohol use disorder (AUD) at a rate of 45 for every 100 participants. This number was greater than other participants with the average around 31 per 100 participants. The same change was also seen in women who were part of a sorority with 26.4% of them having symptoms of AUD while close to 18% of other women felt the same effects.

Stress 
Stressors could include academic stress, family and relationship stress etc. Penn State released a study that showed that the more daily stressors students have in their lives, the more likely students are to engage in alcohol. In the same study it was there was also a direct correlation with drinking to cope with stress and AUDs. There was a higher percentage of students who drank to cope with stress who developed AUDs through their professional career.

Societal influences 
The rise of social media platforms such as Instagram, Facebook, and streaming platforms like Netflix show advertisements for alcoholic beverages. These parties carry a stigma as everyone in the pictures and movies is seen to be having a great time. This encourages students, both in college and high school, to be more tempted to try alcohol or other substances as they too would like to be part of these events and not excluded from such "great" events. The National Longitudinal Survey conducted an analysis in 1997 which showed that a 28% reduction in alcohol advertising theoretically will reduce adolescent alcohol participation by 2–3% and participation in binge drinking from 12% to between 11%–8%.

Effects

Health concerns 
The consequences of binge drinking include alcohol poisoning, nausea and vomiting, unintentional injuries, increased risk of unplanned pregnancies and violent behavior. Each year, 1,825 college students die from alcohol-related unintentional injuries, including motor-vehicle crashes, 696,000 college students are assaulted by another student who has been drinking, and 97,000 college students report an alcohol-related sexual assault or date rape. For students under the legal drinking age of 21 in the United States, alcohol use can result in future unhealthy behavior and impaired brain development as early college age is when the brain is developing. According to studies by McLean Hospital, early alcohol drinking indicates serious problems with alcohol later in life.

Academic performance 
College students who engage in binge drinking tend to have lower grades than those who do not. According to a study by The Center for the Study of Collegiate Mental Health at Pennsylvania State, students who abuse alcohol showed a clear correlation with a lower GPA. As the frequency of binge drinking increases, the GPA decreases. Another study showed increased alcohol abuse directly links to poor motivation for school and poor academic performance.

Student misconduct 
Alcohol use is involved in over half the sexual assault cases on college campuses. For the most part, it is the men being intoxicated that commit acts of sexual assault. In addition, sexual assaults involving alcohol tend to occur between a man and a woman that are not familiar to each other. The very nature of being intoxicated from alcohol tends to make men feel more powerful and privileged, leading to an increase in risk that the man will sexually assault a woman. Furthermore, a professor from Washington State University found through a study that men involved in heavy alcohol consumption are more likely to display acts of sexual aggression.

Alcoholism 
As high as 40% of college students could now be considered alcoholics, as defined by the next edition psychiatry's diagnostic manual, but many of these individuals would be regarded as having only a mild drinking problem. Most college binge drinkers and drug users do not develop lifelong problems.

Legal consequences 
The legal consequences stemming from underage drinking can have severe impacts on a student's life and career. Students who get caught drinking alcohol underage face various repercussions from loss of driver's license, fines, community service, or even jail time. For those of age who are supplying minors with alcohol could also face severe consequences from being charged with a criminal offense to being arrested. Individual schools might also place their own sanctions on students who drink underage that can range from being on probation to expulsion. Many schools also have strict regulations as to having alcohol or consuming alcohol regardless of age in university owned housing. Doing so may result in warnings, probation, and ultimately removal from university owned housing and expulsion from university owned housing in the future.

At certain U.S colleges, campus police will conduct bar raids by taking a certain number of people from the bar to catch underage students drinking. For example, at the University of Illinois, police will give tickets for underage students for just being an arm's length distance from an alcoholic beverage. At other big universities, such as University of Wisconsin-Madison, students have to pay a ticket of more than $250 and also pay for classes about the problems of drinking. Another major consequence is one's chances for college admission. If an individual has pictures on social media of them drinking or has a record with the police for underage drinking, this will cause a bad image of them and will cause issues when applying to schools.

Though not necessarily legal, college drinking has become so common that there are less legal consequences for students caught drinking as compared to non-campus drinking events. Students are encouraged to prioritize safe drinking over non-drinking.  Many schools have transportation services that are specific to drinking so the students are transported safely.

Prevention and treatment

Campus counseling 
Offering campus counseling is one way to prevent students from developing long term consequences. Monitoring and prohibiting the use of fake IDs on or around campus is another way to prevent alcohol abuse amongst students. According to recent statistics, the ownership of a fake ID increased from around 12% prior to entering college to about 32% by the end of sophomore year. In addition, 51% of students say that it is incredibly easy to obtain alcohol on and off campus. Fostering a campus culture that fights against binge drinking is another useful preventative method. According to a study done in 2006, 59% of incoming freshman enter college as non-drinkers. A little more than a month into the first semester, 44% of non-drinkers begin drinking. A way to combat the abuse of alcohol, especially among first year students who are not considered to be drinkers, is to create more spaces and events that do not include alcohol.

See also 

 Alcohol enema
 College health
 Pregaming
 Alcohol advertising on college campuses
 American Indian alcoholism
 Cigarette smoking among college students

References

Further reading
 
 
 
 
 
 Bonnie RJ and O'Connell ME, editors. National Research Council and Institute of Medicine, Reducing Underage Drinking: A Collective Responsibility. Committee on Developing a Strategy to Reduce and Prevent Underage Drinking. Division of Behavioral and Social Sciences and Education. Washington, DC: The National Academies Press, 2004.
 Dodd, L.J., Al-Nakeeb, Y., Nevill, A. and Forshaw, M.J., 2010. Lifestyle risk factors of students: a cluster analytical approach. Preventive medicine, 51(1), pp. 73–77.

Student culture
Alcohol abuse
Drinking culture
Education issues